DIY rainbow crossing was a protest movement that emerged in Sydney, Australia in 2013. The campaign involved individuals creating rainbow pedestrian crossings in chalk to protest the removal of a temporary rainbow crossing from Oxford Street. The temporary crossing was created by the City of Sydney as part of the 35th-anniversary celebration of the Sydney Mardi Gras. When the crossing was to be removed, the community protests and internet activism campaign emerged. In 2013, New South Wales' first permanent rainbow crossing was approved and installed on Lackey St, Summer Hill.  In 2019, a permanent rainbow crossing was unveiled in Taylor Square, on the corner of Bourke and Campbell streets.

History
The rainbow flag or gay pride flag, is associated with the lesbian, gay, bisexual, and transgender (LGBT) community and LGBT activities around the world.

Rainbow crosswalks, Taipei, Taiwan 2008
The idea to create rainbow crosswalks appears to have first emerged in Taipei, Taiwan . A campaign for promoting gender equality organised by the National Taiwan Normal University at the beginning of June, 2008. The creators were Dr.Prof. Jerry H. Hsia and the creative team formed by the Graduate School of Fine Arts, NTNU.

Federal Highway Administration Advisory, 2011 
In 2011, the United States Federal Highway Administration advised that "crosswalk art is actually contrary to the goal of increased safety and most likely could be a contributing factor to a false sense of security for both motorists and pedestrians".

Rainbow crosswalks, West Hollywood 2012
The idea to create rainbow crosswalks in West Hollywood was part of the 2012 Gay Pride Month celebrations, initially proposed by the LA-based artist Martin Duvander with the crosswalks at the intersection of San Vicente Boulevard and Santa Monica Boulevard painted rainbow colours for the month of June.

Rainbow crosswalks, Tel Aviv 2012
In May 2012, Tel Aviv city hall painted a crosswalk in rainbow colours for a photo shoot to promote TYP: Ivri Lider and Johnny Goldstein, the act scheduled to headline the Gay Pride Parade's main concert.  These photos, reminiscent of the Beatles Abbey Road album cover were posted on Facebook and the crosswalk was repainted white a few hours later.

Rainbow crossing, Sydney 2013
The project to create a temporary rainbow crossing in Sydney was modelled on the similar crossings in West Hollywood. On 10 December 2012, City of Sydney Council voted in favour of creating temporary Rainbow Crossings on Oxford Street as a trial, "subject to relevant State Government approvals". The location chosen, Oxford Street by Taylor Square, was the starting point of the original Sydney Gay Mardi Gras and the crossing was to form part of the 35th anniversary celebrations. The estimated cost of the Rainbow Crossing was $110,000, which included painting, compulsory video surveillance and eventual removal.

The rainbow crossing in Sydney proved popular with tourists and locals and many people hoped it would be made a permanent feature of the Oxford Street landscape.  During the community debate over the future of the rainbow crossing, following the Sydney Mardi Gras, the NSW government Minister for Roads and Ports, Duncan Gay MLC, published a letter to the Lord Mayor of Sydney, Clover Moore, listing the reasons for the removal of the temporary crossing on the grounds of pedestrian safety. On Tuesday 9 April 2013, the temporary crossing was removed. On 28 May 2013, Ashfield Council authorised the first permanent rainbow crossing in NSW. NSW’s first permanent rainbow is at Lackey Street Piazza, Summer Hill.

Rainbow crosswalks, St. Louis 2015 
In June 2015, rainbow crossings at Tower Grove and Manchester Crossing in St. Louis, Missouri were painted to celebrate the legalisation of same-sex marriage. In 2016, the city decided to follow the Federal Highway Administration's 2011 advice and prohibited rainbow and fleur-de-lis crosswalks.

Rainbow crosswalks, Seattle 2015 

In 2015, eleven rainbow crossings were painted in Seattle's Capitol Hill neighbourhood. They continue to be maintained year-round as a symbol of the neighbourhood's inclusivity.

Rainbow crosswalks, Minneapolis 2018 
In June 2018, the city of Minneapolis, Minnesota unveiled four rainbow crosswalks to celebrate Twin Cities Pride festivities.

Rainbow crossing, Sydney 2019

On 8 February 2019, a permanent Sydney rainbow crossing was unveiled in Taylor Square, on the corner of Bourke and Campbell streets.

Rainbow crosswalk, Albuquerque 2019 
In early June 2019, the city of Albuquerque, New Mexico unveiled a rainbow crosswalk on historic US Route 66. Just a few days later, a motorcycle gang caused a significant amount of damage to the $30,000 crossing with their motorcycles. Even though at least a dozen bikers were shown on video, only one man, a Trump supporter named Anthony Morgan was arrested for the crime.

Rainbow crosswalks, Ames, Iowa 2019 
In early September 2019, the city council of Ames, Iowa cut the ribbon on a rainbow crosswalk. Subsequently the Federal Highway Administration sent them a letter "requesting" that it be removed. The city council ignored the letter.

Rainbow crosswalks, San Diego 2020 
On 11 January 2010, a rainbow crosswalk was unveiled under the pre-existing rainbow flag in the Hillcrest neighbourhood in San Diego, California. Openly lesbian State Senate President pro tem Toni Atkins and openly gay Assemblymember Todd Gloria praised "out and proud" city council member Chris Ward  for "getting the job done." Openly lesbian council members Jennifer Campbell and Georgette Gomez also attended the "Catwalk on the Crosswalk."

Community protests and internet activism
The removal of the crossing inspired a rainbow chalk community protest started by Sydney local James Brechney. People followed his lead by creating their own DIY rainbow crossings with chalk and sharing pictures on social media. The campaign also featured internet activism with the Facebook Page, DIY Rainbow. Pictures of chalk rainbow crossings from many places around the world appeared on social media including Paris, Shanghai, Pretoria, Thailand and Cambodia. Facebook would later credit DIY Rainbow as one of the top 10 pages of Facebook over its first 10 years.

Summer Hill Rainbow Crossing
Support for the rainbow crossing spread across Sydney, including local communities.  On 14 April 2013, in response to the removal of the Rainbow Crossing in Oxford St, Darlinghurst, parents and children from several local schools chalked a rainbow in the public square at Summer Hill, as part of the DIY Rainbow Crossing movement.

On 15 April 2013, Ashfield Council workers removed the rainbow. After media attention, council issued a statement labelling it a slip hazard and requested a permit be obtained before it could be re-chalked. The events were covered in The Daily Telegraph, The Australian, Perth Now, and on 2DAY FM.

On 17 April 2013, it was rechalked by more than 100 people, including local councillor, Alex Lofts. On 18 April, it was again removed, only to be re-chalked. Since that date it has remained chalked. A group of families and supporters continue to chalk the rainbow, especially after rain. This group has also ensured the area remains free of litter; they also hold occasional performances and arts-related celebrations at the site. Some local businesses have offered discounts and support for the rainbow, these display a logo with a stylised image of the rainbow crossing on it. A Summer Hill Rainbow Crossing Facebook page was used to support the community protest.

At an Ashfield Council meeting on 28 May 2013 the council passed a motion that a permanent outline of a rainbow be painted in Summer Hill Square, with the understanding that this may be periodically 'chalked in' by children, families and community members.

Wider adoption of the protest movement
The original DIY rainbow crossing protest movement was generated by the debate over the rainbow crossing in Sydney, however DIY rainbow crossings continue to appear as protests in other settings including a crossing outside the Russian embassy in Stockholm, Sweden in August 2013 believed to be in protest against new legislation in Russia.

See also
 LGBT social movements

References

2013 in Australia
2013 in LGBT history
2013 protests
2010s in Sydney
DIY culture
Do it yourself
Internet activism
LGBT art
LGBT civil rights demonstrations
LGBT history in Australia
LGBT symbols
Pedestrian crossings
Protests in Australia
Public art
Rainbow flags